Centromadia pungens, the common spikeweed or common tarweed, is a species of North American plants in the tribe Madieae within the family Asteraceae. It is native to northern Baja California and the western United States (California, Oregon, Washington, Idaho, Nevada, Arizona). The plant is considered a noxious weed in parts of the Pacific Northwest.

It produces arrays of numerous yellow flower heads with both ray florets and disc florets.

Subspecies
 Centromadia pungens subsp. laevis (D.D.Keck) B.G.Baldwin - Baja California, southern California
 Centromadia pungens subsp. pungens - most of species range

References

External links
 Calflora Database: Centromadia pungens (Common spikeweed,  Common tarweed)
 Jepson eFlora (TJM2): Centromadia pungens 
USDA Plants Profile for Centromadia pungens (common tarweed)

Madieae
Flora of the Northwestern United States
Flora of the Southwestern United States
Flora of Baja California
Flora of California
Plants described in 1839
Taxa named by William Jackson Hooker
Taxa named by Edward Lee Greene
Flora without expected TNC conservation status